Joyce Horton (born May 14, 1935) is an American sailor. She competed in the Dragon event at the 1952 Summer Olympics.

References

External links
 

1935 births
Living people
American female sailors (sport)
Olympic sailors of the United States
Sailors at the 1952 Summer Olympics – Dragon
Sportspeople from Los Angeles
21st-century American women